Zornitza Koleva Simeonova (born 4 August 1979) is a Spanish handball player, playing for the club Vícar Goya and on the Spanish women's national team.

Born in Bulgaria to Czech refugees, she played on the  Spanish team at the 2008 European Women's Handball Championship, where the Spanish team reached the final, after defeating Germany in the semifinal.

References

1979 births
Living people
Spanish female handball players
Spanish people of Czech descent